Dioryctria horneana is a species of snout moth in the genus Dioryctria. It was described by Harrison Gray Dyar Jr. in 1919 and is endemic to Cuba.

The wingspan is 22–30 mm.

The larvae feed on the cones of Pinus cubensis, Pinus caribea and Pinus tropicalis.

References

Moths described in 1919
horneana
Endemic fauna of Cuba